Transport abstraction is the ability to change service transport protocol implementations 
in a configuration file with no change to business logic implementation code.

Transport abstraction may be achieved through the use of standardized connectivity interfaces within for all service transport protocol implementations.
 
This architectural abstraction offers great benefit to architects and developers, as it lowers risk involved with regard to technologies and service protocols deployed. An organization may determine at a later date that a different protocol is required. This may then be changed at run time via a configuration file.

The originally deployed service transport protocol might also be augmented with another service implementation in a differing protocol, configured to offer the same business logic implementations or a subset thereof. 

This architectural abstraction also allows alternative environments (e.g. development, testing, etc.) to simplify deployment configuration without change to the business logic implementation code.

See also
elemenope

References
elemenope User Guide

External links
elemenope home page

Software architecture